The Democratic People's Republic of Korea women's national football team (Munhwaŏ Korean: 조선민주주의인민공화국 녀자 국가종합팀, recognized as Korea DPR by FIFA) represents North Korea in international women's football. North Korea won the AFC Women's Asian Cup in 2001 (scoring 51 goals in 6 matches, a standing record), 2003, and 2008, and reached the quarterfinals of the 2007 FIFA Women's World Cup.

North Korea was regularly ranked in the top ten teams worldwide in the FIFA World Rankings. It was dropped from the December 2020 rankings due to inactivity, having not played since March 2019, but has since returned to the rankings after FIFA increased its inactivity interval from 18 months to 4 years; it currently remains in the top ten despite not having played a match in over three years.

History

Disqualification for 2015 FIFA Women's World Cup
During the team's participation at the 2011 FIFA Women's World Cup, on 7 July 2011, FIFA announced that two of its players, Song Jong-Sun and Jong Pok-Sim, had failed doping tests during the tournament and were provisionally suspended prior to their team's match against Colombia. On 16 July, FIFA announced that three additional players from North Korea tested positive following target testing of the whole team. On 25 August 2011, the North Korean team was fined  400,000 which is equal to the prize it received by finishing 13th in the 2011 tournament, and was excluded from participation at the 2015 FIFA Women's World Cup, including its qualification round.

Results and fixtures

The following is a list of match results in the last 12 months, as well as any future matches that have been scheduled.

Legend

Coaching staff

Current coaching staff

Manager history

  Jo Song-ok (1999-present)

Players

Current squad

Recent call ups
 The following players have been called up to a North Korea squad in the past 12 months.

Honours

Continental
AFC Women's Asian Cup
 Champions: 2001, 2003, 2008 
 Runners-up: 1993, 1997, 2010

Asian Games
 Champions: 2002, 2006, 2014
 Runners-up: 1998, 2010

Regional
EAFF E-1 Football Championship
 Champions: 2013, 2015, 2017
 Runners-up: 2005, 2008

Other invitational tournaments
Albena Cup
 Champions: 2002
Australia Cup
 Champions: 2004
Cyprus Women's Cup
 Champions: 2019
Four Nations Tournament
 Champions: 2012

Competitive record

FIFA Women's World Cup

*Draws include knockout matches decided on penalty kicks.

Olympic Games

AFC Women's Asian Cup

*Draws include knockout matches decided on penalty kicks.

Asian Games

EAFF E-1 Football Championship

*Draws include knockout matches decided on penalty kicks.

Algarve Cup
The Algarve Cup is an invitational tournament for national teams in women's association football hosted by the Portuguese Football Federation (FPF). Held annually in the Algarve region of Portugal since 1994, it is one of the most prestigious and longest-running women's international football events and has been nicknamed the "Mini FIFA Women's World Cup".

Cyprus Women's Cup

Four Nations Tournament

See also

Sport in North Korea
Football in North Korea
Women's football in North Korea
North Korea women's national under-20 football team
North Korea women's national under-17 football team
North Korea men's national football team
North Korea–South Korea football rivalry

References

External links

 
Korea DPR